Medari is a village in municipality of Dragalić in Brod-Posavina County, Croatia. 

The Medari massacre took place in this village on 1 May 1995.

References

Populated places in Brod-Posavina County